I'm Jimmy Reed is an album by blues musician Jimmy Reed, compiling twelve tracks originally issued as singles between 1953 and 1958, that was released by the Vee-Jay label.

Reception

AllMusic reviewer Bruce Eder stated: "I'm Jimmy Reed, was about as strong a first album as was heard in Chicago blues ... As was the case with most bluesmen of his generation, Reed's debut LP was really a collection of single sides than an actual album of new material (though some of it did hail from its year of release), consisting of tracks he'd recorded from June 1953 through March 1958 ... But that also turns I'm Jimmy Reed into a treasure-trove of prime material from his repertory, including the songs on which he'd built his reputation over the previous five years ... which help give this album more depth and breadth than a formal hits collection would have had".

Track listing
All compositions credited to Jimmy Reed
 "Honest I Do" – 2:40
 "Go on to School" – 2:47
 "My First Plea" – 2:45
 "Boogie in the Dark" – 2:34
 "You Got Me Crying" – 2:35
 "Ain't That Lovin' You Baby" – 2:14
 "You Got Me Dizzy" – 2:53
 "Little Rain" – 2:45
 "Can't Stand to See You Go" – 2:50
 "Roll and Rhumba" – 2:46
 "You're Something Else" – 2:35
 "You Don't Have to Go" – 3:04
Recorded in Chicago on June 6, 1953 (track 10), December 29/30, 1953 (tracks 4 & 12), December 5, 1955 (tracks 6 & 9), June 11, 1956 (track 3), October 3, 1956 (track 7),  January 9, 1957 (track 8), April 3, 1957 (track 1), December 12, 1957 (track 11), March 12, 1958 (tracks 2 & 5)

Personnel
Jimmy Reed – guitar, vocals, harmonica
Remo Biondi (tracks 2, 5 & 11), John Brim (track 10), Eddie Taylor (tracks 1-9, 11 & 12) – guitar 
Vernel Fournier (tracks 6 & 9), Albert King (tracks 4, 10 & 12), Earl Phillips (tracks 1-3, 5, 7, 8 & 11) – drums

References

Jimmy Reed albums
1959 albums
Vee-Jay Records albums